Ana Eduarda Santos  (Lisbon, 1983) is a Portuguese writer of novels, plays and translations.

She was the youngest winner ever of the Revelation Prize/Fiction - First Novel (Prémio Revelação APE) in 1999, aged 16 for "Luz e Sombra" (Light and Shadow). She has also won the Eça de Queiroz Award for Short Stories (2001) and the Júlio Graça Award for Short Stories (2003).

Santos has published two novels, a play and a collection of short stories in Portugal, as well as a play in France, Calluna Vulgaris (Gare au Théâtre), which premiered in Paris in 2001. 

She has also translated into Portuguese some works from the Italian, among which are Umberto Eco's A Passo di Gambero  and Ugo Foscolo's Sonets.

References

Living people
Portuguese women writers
Year of birth missing (living people)
People from Lisbon